Chromosome 9 open reading frame 50 is a protein that in humans is encoded by the C9orf50 gene. C9orf50 has one other known alias, FLJ35803. In humans the gene coding sequence is 10,051 base pairs long, transcribing an mRNA of 1,624 bases that encodes a 431 amino acid protein.

Gene

Location 
In humans the gene is located on the negative strand at 9q34.11 and the coding sequence is 8,552 base pairs long. On human chromosome 9, the gene spans bases chr9:132,374,504-132,383,055 Near C9orf50 is ASB6 which is the gene directly before C9orf50 on the negative strand and on the positive strand is NTMT1 which is more than double the size of C9orf50.[1][2]

Protein 

The C9orf50 protein has a molecular weight of 47,639 kD and consists 431 amino acids with a predicted isoelectric point of 10.38 The C9orf50 protein contains the conserved domain in pfam15737- DUF4685, the function of which is not well understood and conserved in vertebrates. The protein is made up of 7 exons.

Isoforms 
C9orf50 has 9 different splice isoforms (SI) and 11 different transcript variants (TV), the most common is isoform 1 and transcript variant 1.

Domains 
The protein can be analyzed as a whole as well as split into 3 parts including the N-terminalDomain of 193 residues, DUF4685 of 103 residues, and the C-terminal Domain of 135 residues. The full protein pI is similar to the average pI of the NTD, DUF4685, and CTD. Of these sections the NTD has
the highest pI and mW but also has the most residues at 193 of 431.

Composition 
The compositional analysis of the C9orf50 protein reveals low amounts of I, M, Y and FIKMNY relative to humans and high amounts of R, and KR-ED. There are no findings for charge clusters, high scoring charged or uncharged segments, charge runs, patterns, high scoring hydrophobic or transmembrane segments. Three different unique spacings of C were found at positions 161, 190, and 342. C9orf50 is also found to have 3 repetitive structures, the first sequence PRLP_KLT occurs starting at position 30 and then is repeated at position 78. Another repetitive structure is SLLP at positions 99 and 398. The last repeat structure at 250 and 303 made of KAAL.

Tertiary Structure 
Tertiary C9orf50 protein structures can be found using I-Tasser. This tool results in 5 visualized structures, the two with the highest C scores are -3.25 and -1.27.

Gene level regulation

Promoter 
The promoter region for C9orf50 was found using the Genomatix
Gene2Promoter search engine. This resulted in 6 found promoter regions. Only 2 of which were supported by transcripts and cage tags. The most supported promoter region spans 1,962 bases and is conserved in 6 of 8 orthologous loci with 945 cage tags. The transcription start site was determined to be located at 1,503 from a transcript with 7 exons supported by 118 cage tags.

Transcription factor binding sites 
There are hundreds of transcription factors that are predicted to bind the promoter region. The promoter region transcription factors table highlight 20 of these.

Transcript Level Regulation 
C9orf50 5' UTR intermolecular base paired structure with the highest delta G is -323.4 kcal/mol. This is the lowest energy structure predicted for the 5'UTR region. For the 3 ' UTR, the highest dG is -127.5 kcal/mol indicating that it is not as stable as the 5' UTR.

Tissue expression 
RNA-seq data of C9orf50 has found a low expression level, 25-50th percentile, in most human tissues compared to all human proteins. However, it is most highly expressed in testes, brain and gallbladder. C9orf50 protein expression is higher than the C9orf50 RNA expression. When studying in situ hybridization data, The mouse C9orf50 ortholog, symbol 1700001O22Rik, was used to compare protein expression against Beta-actin which is ubiquitously expressed and the analyses shows similar expression patterns in the mouse brain. During development, the protein can be found in the fetal stages.

Subcelluar expression 
The protein has been located primarily in the nucleus and less so found in mitochondria and cytosol.

Orthologs 
There are no known paralogs of C9orf50. orthologs of C9orf50 have been found conserved across most subclasses of mammals with the furthest, opossum of the infraclass marsupialia,  diverged 159 million years ago. This gene is not found in reptiles, amphibians, birds, or any other organisms evolved before mammals. A list of mammals in which C9orf50 is conserved is shown below.

Evolution 
C9orf50 is predicted to evolve more quickly than other common proteins including cytochrome C, hemoglobin beta, and fibrinogen alpha chain.

Amino acid conservation 
Important amino acids are characterized by those that were on the 100% consensus line created in MView of the strict ortholog multiple sequence alignment. Amino Acids in red represent conserved amino acids in DUF4685. 14 of the 22 highly conserved amino acids are found within this domain. Leucine occupies the most conserved positions of the C9orf50 protein.

Mutations 

Common variants in C9orf50 were found with NCBI SNPGeneView.

References